The Franklin Delano Roosevelt Memorial is a presidential memorial in Washington D.C., dedicated to the memory of Franklin Delano Roosevelt, the 32nd President of the United States, and to the era he represents. The memorial is the second of two that have been constructed in Washington to commemorate that president.

Dedicated on May 2, 1997 by President Bill Clinton, the national memorial, spread over  adjacent to the southwest side of the Tidal Basin along the Cherry Tree Walk in West Potomac Park, traces 12 years of the history of the United States through a sequence of four outdoor rooms, one for each of FDR's terms of office. Sculptures inspired by photographs depict the 32nd president alongside his dog Fala.

Other sculptures depict scenes from the Great Depression, such as listening to a fireside chat on the radio and waiting in a bread line, a bronze sculpture by George Segal. A bronze statue of First Lady Eleanor Roosevelt standing before the United Nations emblem honors her dedication to the UN. It is the only presidential memorial to depict a First Lady.   
   
Considering Roosevelt's disability, the memorial's designers intended to create a memorial that would be accessible to those with various physical impairments. Among other features, the memorial includes an area with tactile reliefs with braille writing for people who are blind. However, the memorial faced serious criticism from disabled activists. Vision-impaired visitors complained that the braille dots were improperly spaced and that some of the braille and reliefs were mounted eight feet off of the ground, placing it above the reach of most people.

Design and features

The memorial's design and development represents the capstone of a distinguished career for the memorial's designer, landscape architect Lawrence Halprin partly because Halprin had fond memories of Roosevelt, and partly because of the sheer difficulty of the task. 
   
Halprin won the competition for the Memorial's design in 1974. However, Congress did not appropriate the funds to move beyond this conceptual stage for more than 20 years. Halprin collaborated with architect Robert Marquis who designed the visitor center in the winning plans.

The memorial's design concept of four outdoor "rooms" and gardens is animated by water, stone, and sculpture. The national memorial now includes sculptures and works by Leonard Baskin, Neil Estern, Robert Graham, Tom Hardy, and George Segal.

Running water is an important physical and metaphoric component of the memorial. Each of the four "rooms" representing Roosevelt's respective terms in office contains a waterfall. As one moves from room to room, the waterfalls become larger and more complex, reflecting the increasing complexity of a presidency marked by the vast upheavals of economic depression and world war.

Tour guides describe the symbolism of the five main water areas as:

 A single large drop – The crash of the economy that led to the Great Depression
 Multiple stairstep drops – The Tennessee Valley Authority dam-building project
 Chaotic falls at varying angles – World War II
 A still pool – Roosevelt's death
 A wide array combining the earlier waterfalls – A retrospective of Roosevelt's presidency

The architecture critic of the Washington Post stated that the memorial was designed "to give people as many options as possible to go this way or that, to reverse directions, to pause, to start over, to be alone, to meet others, and to experience as many different sights, smells and sounds as the site permits."

When the memorial first opened, people were encouraged to wade into the fountains and waterfalls. However, within a matter of days, the National Park Service (NPS), which operates the Memorial, while fearing accidents prohibited people from entering the water.

The site is a component of the NPS's National Mall and Memorial Parks administrative unit. As a historic area that the NPS manages, the memorial was administratively listed on the National Register of Historic Places on the date of its establishment, May 2, 1997.

Wheelchair depiction
The statue of Franklin Delano Roosevelt stirred controversy over the issue of his disability. Designers decided against plans to have FDR shown in a wheelchair. Instead, the statue depicts the president in a chair with a cloak obscuring the chair, showing him as he appeared to the public during his life.  Roosevelt's reliance on a wheelchair was not publicized during his life, as there was a stigma of weakness and instability associated with any disability. However, historians and some disability-rights advocates wanted his disability to be shown for historical accuracy and to tell the story of what they believed to be the source of his strength.  Other disability advocates, while not necessarily against showing him in a wheelchair, were wary of protests about the memorial that leaned toward making Roosevelt a hero because of his disability.

The sculptor added casters to the back of the chair in deference to advocates, making it a symbolic "wheelchair". The casters are only visible behind the statue.
 
The National Organization on Disability, headed by the efforts of Alan Reich, raised US$1.65 million over two years to fund the addition of another statue that clearly showed the president in a wheelchair. In January 2001, the additional statue was placed near the memorial entrance showing FDR seated in a wheelchair much like the one he actually used.  The memorial's designer construed the wheelchair controversy as evidence of success: "The most important thing about designing is to generate creativity in others, and to be inclusive – to include the needs and experiences of people interacting with the environment, and to let them be part of its creation."

Gallery

Original Franklin Delano Roosevelt Memorial

During a conversation that he had with Supreme Court Associate Justice Felix Frankfurter in 1941, Roosevelt said that if he were to have a monument in Washington, it should be in front of the National Archives and should be no larger than his desk. The engraved words on the memorial state: "In Memory of Franklin Delano Roosevelt 1882–1945".

A bronze plaque at the edge of the sidewalk in front of the memorial states:

Further reading

See also
List of statues of Franklin D. Roosevelt
List of national memorials of the United States
List of sculptures of presidents of the United States
History of fountains in the United States
Franklin D. Roosevelt Four Freedoms Park, New York City; site of another memorial park, opened in 2012.
 Architecture of Washington, D.C.
 Presidential memorials in the United States

References

External links

 FDR Memorial Trust for the National Mall
 Franklin Delano Roosevelt Memorial Official NPS website
 NOD.org FDR Wheelchair Statue Campaign

Roosevelt, Franklin Delano Memorial
National Mall and Memorial Parks
National Memorials of the United States
Monuments and memorials in Washington, D.C.
Monuments and memorials on the National Register of Historic Places in Washington, D.C.
Outdoor sculptures in Washington, D.C.
Public art in Washington, D.C.
Bronze sculptures in Washington, D.C.
Fountains in Washington, D.C.
1997 sculptures
1997 establishments in Washington, D.C.
Cultural depictions of Franklin D. Roosevelt
Cultural depictions of Eleanor Roosevelt
Sculptures of dogs in the United States
Dog monuments
Roosevelt, Franklin Delano
Sculptures of women in Washington, D.C.
Monuments and memorials to Eleanor Roosevelt
Southwest (Washington, D.C.)